Bộ Tư lệnh Thông tin Women's Volleyball Club is a Vietnamese women's volleyball club based in Hanoi. Bộ Tư lệnh Thông tin is the most successful Vietnamese professional club, with a record of twelve national titles. All members of the club are members of the People's Army of Vietnam. The club was registered and established in 1970.

Previous names
 Bộ Tư lệnh Thông tin (1970–2008; 2022–)
 Bộ Tư lệnh Thông tin Trust Bank (2008–2009)
 Thông tin Liên Việt Bank (2010)
 Thông tin LienVietPostBank (2010–2021)
 Bộ Tư lệnh Thông tin - FLC (2021–2022)

Honours

Domestic competitions
Vietnam League 
  Winners (12): 2004, 2005, 2006, 2008, 2010, 2012, 2013, 2014, 2015, 2019, 2020, 2021
  Runners-up (5): 2009, 2011, 2016, 2017, 2018

Hung Vuong Volleyball Cup - Final Round 1 
  Winners (4): 2009, 2010, 2011, 2013
  Runners-up (4): 2012, 2015, 2016, 2018
  3rd place (4): 2005, 2006, 2017, 2019

Hoa Lu Volleyball Cup 
  Winners (4): 2004, 2012, 2013, 2014
  Runners-up (2): 2008, 2022

Vietnamese Super Cup
  Winners (6): 2010, 2012, 2013, 2014, 2015, 2018
  Runners-up (2): 2009, 2011
  3rd place (2): 2016, 2017

VTV9 - Binh Dien International Women's Volleyball Cup 
  Winners (3): 2011, 2013, 2014
  Runners-up (2): 2010, 2015
  3rd place (2): 2006, 2012

LienVietPostBank Cup
  Winners (4): 2011, 2013, 2014, 2017
  Runners-up (2): 2012, 2019

Vietnam National Games (participated as Military)
  Winners (4): 2006, 2010, 2014, 2022
  Runners-up (1): 2018

Vietnam League (defunct)
  Winners (7): 1988, 1989, 1991, 1994, 1995, 2002, 2003
  Runners-up (4): 1987, 1990, 1992, 1996
  3rd place (3): 1993, 1997, 1999

Vietnam A1 League (defunct)
  Winners (12): 1972, 1973, 1974, 1975, 1976, 1977, 1980, 1981, 1982, 1984, 1985, 1986
  Runners-up (2): 1978, 1983

International competitions
Asian Club Championship (5 appearances)
 2011 — 4th place
 2013 — 5th place
 2014 — 6th place
 2015 — 7th place
 2016 — 6th place
Military World Games 
 2015 —  Bronze medal

Youth competitions
Vietnam Youth Volleyball Championship
  Winners (14):  1994, 1997, 1998, 2000, 2003, 2004, 2005, 2006, 2007, 2008, 2011, 2014, 2019, 2020
  Runners-up (7): 2009, 2010, 2012, 2013, 2015, 2016, 2018
  3rd place (1): 2017

Vietnam Youth Volleyball Club Championship
  Winners (6): 2012, 2013, 2016, 2019, 2020, 2022
  Runners-up (3): 2010, 2011, 2015
  3rd place (3): 2014, 2017, 2018

Vietnam U-23 Volleyball Championship
  Runners-up (2): 2020, 2022

Current squad
 Heach Coach:  Phạm Minh Dũng
 Assistant Coach:  Phạm Thị Yến,  Phạm Thị Thu Trang,  Nguyễn Trọng Linh

Notes:
 OH Outside Hitter
 OP Opposite Spiker
 S Setter
 MB Middle Blocker
 L Libero
 INJ Player withdrew from the squad due to an injury

Position main

Youth team
 Heach Coach:  Nguyễn Thị Thu Ngọc
 Assistant Coach:  Đỗ Thị Minh,  Nguyễn Trọng Linh

Former head coach 
 Phạm Thanh Lãng (1970–1986)
 Nguyễn Hữu Dông (1986–2000)
 Phạm Văn Long (2000–2017)
 Bùi Huy Sơn (2017–2021)

Notable players 

Domestic players

 Đặng Thị Phụ
 Hoàng Thị Quế
 Trần Bích Khả
 Nguyễn Thanh Mai
 Nguyễn Thị Kim Thanh
 Bùi Bích Nụ
 Lê Thị Phúc
 Trần Thị Thủy
 Võ Thị Minh An
 Phạm Thanh Hà
 Lê Thị Tri
 Nguyễn Thị Thu Lan
 Phạm Thanh Nhận
 Đỗ Bích Ngọc
 Nguyễn Thúy Oanh
 Nguyễn Thị Kim Dung
 Nguyễn Thị Hiền
 Nguyễn Thị Thu Hằng
 Nguyễn Thị Tâm Anh
 Nguyễn Thị Dung
 Nguyễn Thị Thu Hương
 Phạm Thu Hương
 Ngô Tuyết Trinh
 Nguyễn Thị Nhâm
 Hà Thị Hoa
 Phạm Thị Ngọc Anh
 Nguyễn Thị Thu Ngọc
 Nguyễn Thị Kiên
 Nguyễn Hương Lan
 Nguyễn Thị Hương
 Vũ Thị Thúy
 Bùi Thị Tám
 Trần Ngọc Diệp
 Bùi Thị Thảo Phương
 Lê Thị Thúy
 Vũ Thị Minh Nguyệt
 Phạm Thị Kim Huệ
 Phạm Thị Thu Trang
 Tạ Thị Diệu Linh
 Đặng Thị Thoan
 Phạm Thị Liên
 Vương Thị Mai
 Mai Thị Bích
 Phạm Thị Yến
 Hà Ngọc Diễm
 Đinh Thị Trà Giang
 Trần Thị Thảo
 Trần Tôn Nữ Ly Linh
 Nguyễn Thị Thu Hường
 Phạm Thị Minh Huệ
 Lý Thị Hồng Ngân
 Bùi Thị Minh Huệ
 Chu Thị Ngọc
 Đỗ Thị Minh
 Trần Thu Trang
 Phạm Thị Hồng Nhung
 Đặng Thu Huyền
 Vũ Thị Thu Hà
 Bùi Thị Bích Phương
 Bùi Thị Ngà
 Nguyễn Linh Chi

Foreign players

 Chen Jing
 Li Yu Chen
 Liu Wei
 Zhao Yanni

References

Official website

Vietnamese volleyball clubs
Bắc Ninh province
Hanoi
Volleyball clubs established in 1970
Volleyball in Vietnam
1970 establishments in Vietnam
Military sports clubs